Aristolochia reticulata, the Red River snakeroot, Texas Dutchman's pipe, or Texas pipevine, is a species of perennial herb in the family Aristolochiaceae, and endemic to Arkansas, Louisiana, Oklahoma, and Texas. Its habit is erect to sprawling, up to 0.4 meters in height. It flowers in summer and late spring, and summer and grows in moist, sandy soils.

Synonyms
 Siphisia reticulata (Nutt.) Klotzsch

References

 Nuttall, Trans. Amer. Philos. Soc., n.s. 5: 162. 1835.
 The Plant List
 USDA Plants Profile
 Flora of North America

reticulata